Macrochirichthys macrochirus, the long pectoral-fin minnow or giant sword minnow, is a species of cyprinid fish found in rivers and lakes in Southeast Asia (Vietnam and Thailand to the Greater Sundas) where it is used as a food fish. It is the only member of its genus.

Range in Thailand
Found in the south of Thailand, Chao Phraya River, Mekong River, Nan River, Mae Klong River, and Tapee River Basin from Nonthaburi, Ayutthaya, Ratchaburi and Chiang Rai Provinces.

References

External links
 
 

Cyprinid fish of Asia
Fish of Southeast Asia
Fish described in 1844